Junctophilin-3 is a protein that in humans, is encoded by the JPH3 gene. The gene is approximately 97 kilobases long and is located at position 16q24.2. Junctophilin proteins are associated with the formation of junctional membrane complexes linking the plasma membrane with the endoplasmic reticulum in excitable cells. Junctophilin-3 is specific to the brain and has an active role in neurons involved in motor coordination and memory.

The protein contains 748 amino acid residues and is composed of a C-terminal hydrophobic segment that spans the endoplasmic/sarcoplasmic reticulum membrane, and a remaining cytoplasmic domain that shows specific affinity for the plasma membrane. The protein contains several MORN (membrane occupation and recognition nexus) repeats, that contribute to plasma membrane binding through interactions with phospholipids.

Junctophilin-3 is primarily expressed within the brain, specifically the dorsolateral prefrontal cortex. Although the precise function of the protein has not been determined, it has been demonstrated to play a role in motor coordination and memory through efficient calcium ion signaling, and the stabilization of neuronal cellular architecture.

The JPH3 gene contains a CAG/CTG trinucleotide repeat segment. The expansion of this segment is associated with a number of polyglutamine diseases (polyQ), which include spinocerebellar ataxia, Huntington's disease, and Huntington's disease-like 2 (HDL2). The pathological expansion of the CAG repeat coding region leads to an expanded polyQ tract, which aggregate in degenerated neurons leading to the degeneration of specific neuronal subpopulations.

References

External links 
  GeneReviews/NCBI/NIH/UW entry on Huntington Disease-Like 2

Further reading